Roland Kickinger (born March 30, 1968) is an Austrian actor and bodybuilder from Vienna. Standing 6 ft 4 in tall (1.93 m) and weighing from 250-300 pounds (113 to 136 kg), he has appeared in numerous bodybuilding competitions, fitness magazines and training videos.

In his acting career, Kickinger is perhaps best known for his regular role as Chip Rommel in the television series Son of the Beach. He also played the young version of fellow Austrian-American, Arnold Schwarzenegger, in the 2005 TV movie See Arnold Run, which later led to him appearing in the 2009 film Terminator Salvation as a prototype of the T-800 (with Schwarzenegger's likeness digitally applied over his own). He also had minor roles in the films Street Warrior and Disaster Movie, both released in 2008.

Acting

Filmography
{| class="wikitable sortable"
! Year !! Title !! Role !! Notes
|-
|rowspan=2| 1998 || An Eye for Talent  || Doorman || Short film
|-
| Lethal Weapon 4  || Detective || Uncredited role
|-
| 1999 || Gone to Maui || Schulz ||
|-
|rowspan=2| 2001 || Skippy || Bodybuilder ||
|-
| 15 Minutes (Short film)  || Austrian || Uncredited role
|-
| 2002 || Shoot or Be Shot || Sven ||
|-
|rowspan=2| 2005 || Candy Paint || Moe Petrowski || Short film
|-
| See Arnold Run || Arnold Schwarzenegger ||
|-
| 2006 || Against Type''' || Jake Stackley ||
|-
| 2007 || Andrea: Heart of the Giant || Edouard Carpentier ||
|-
|rowspan=2| 2008 || Street Warrior || Showman ||
|-
| Disaster Movie || Hulk ||
|-
|rowspan=3| 2009 || Raven || John Salem ||
|-
| Terminator Salvation || T-800 ||
|-
| Peranmai || Anderson || Indian film
|-
| 2010 || Sebastian || Tony ||
|-
|rowspan=2| 2011 || The Program || Cilas || Television film
|-
| Alone || Grenne || Short film
|-
| 2012 || Blow Me || || Short film
|-
|rowspan=2| 2018 || Groomzilla || Ox || Television film
|-
| Heart Of Everest || Himself || Documentary
|-
|rowspan=2| 2021 || Fourth Grade || Ronnie Adams ||
|-
| David Mirisch, the Man Behind the Golden Stars || Himself || Documentary
|}

Television

1997: Hang Time- As Body Builder (1 episode, "Sexual Harassment")
1997-1998: Team Knight Rider - As Roland (2 episodes)
1998: The Secret Diary of Desmond Pfeiffer - As Lars (1 episode, "Saving Mr. Loncoln")
1999: Caroline in the City - As Lars (1 episode, "Caroline and the Big Bad Bed")
1999: Home Improvement - As Dolph Schnetterling (1 episode, "Love's Labor Lost: Part 1")
1999-2000: Shasta McNasty - As big weightlifter/Buff Denis (2 episodes)
2000-2001: The Howard Stern Radio Show - Himself (2 episodes)
2000-2001: Howard Stern - Himself (2 episodes)
2000-2002: Son of the Beach - As Chip Rommel (42 episodes)
2001: The Test - As Himself/Panelist (1 Episode, "The Social Science Test")
2003: The King of Queens - As Vin (1 episode, "Affidavit Justice")
2004: The Help - As Adolf (1 episode, "Dwayne Gets a Cold")
2005-2006: Unfabulous As Sven (4 episodes)
2006: The Closer - As Hoyt (1 episode, "Out of Focus")
2008: Asia Uncut - Himself (1 episode)
2009: The Jace Hall Show - Himself (1 episode, "Sanctuary & Terminator Salvation")
2009: According to Jim - As Sven (1 episode, "Physical Therapy")
2010: Chuck - As a Volkoff Industries security Guard (1 episode, "Chuck Versus the Aisle of Terror")
2012: Cardio World - Himself (1 episode, "Lift Weights!... to get Smaller?")
2015: Big Time In Hollywood, FL - Fake Alan (1 Episode, "Monkey Largo")
2021: Knight's End'' - Wutan (2 Episodes)

References

External links
 

1968 births
Living people
Austrian male film actors
Austrian bodybuilders
Male actors from Vienna
Austrian male television actors